Josh Weru is a 19 year old international rugby union player, who plays for the Kenyan National Team as a Number 8. Formally was part of Northampton Saints Academy.

Career 
At 14 years old, Weru joined the Northampton Saints Academy.

On the 3 August, 2022, Josh Weru signed a professional contract with Northampton Saints after graduating from their Under-18 set up. His main strength was his ball carrying ability with academy coach, Will Parkin saying: “His ball-carrying ability is amongst the very best we’ve seen at Under-18s level”.

Unfortunately, late in 2022 he lost his contract with Northampton, before he managed to debut for the senior team, due to his aspirations to play for the Kenyan National Team. Under the RFU’s eligibility criteria, to secure a working visa to play professional rugby, a player from a Tier 3 nation (such as Kenya) has to have a minimum of 10 international Test caps, of which three must be played during the previous 24 months.

International career 
In 2020 at only 16 years old Weru was called up to the Kenya U20s squad by Simbas head coach Paul Odera.

In 2022 Weru was called up to Kenyan National Team for the 2023 Rugby World Cup Final Qualification Tournament, where he scored on debut. Coming of the bench to run a 60 metre try in Kenyas 68-14 loss to the USA. Weru earned 2 more caps in the remaining matches in the tournament, against Portugal (in which he started at Number 8) and Hong Kong.

International tries

References

External links 

Living people

2003 births
Northampton Saints players